A weasand clip is a device used in slaughtering animals in an abattoir.  The clip is used to seal the weasand (the usual term for the animal's esophagus in slaughtering) so that the stomach contents do not leak out.

References
 "Safe Handling of Foods" by Jeffrey M. Farber and Ewen Cameron David Todd (2000) Page 13.
 "Encyclopedia of labeling meat and poultry products" by Jackson William Bailey (1970) Page 86.

External links
 US Patent 6190249

Meat industry
Farming tools